Durarara!! is a 2010 anime series directed by Takahiro Omori and produced by Brain's Base. The episodes are adapted from the light novels of the same name, written by Ryōgo Narita and illustrated by Suzuhito Yasuda. The series follows several people in Ikebukuro: Celty Sturluson, a dullahan working as an underground courier while looking for her lost head; an internet-based anonymous gang called the Dollars; and the chaos that unfolds around the most dangerous people in the city. The anime began airing in Japan on January 8, 2010. The series was aired by the MBS television network, followed by the TBS, CBC, and Bandai Channel networks. Crunchyroll simulcasts the anime within 24 hours of its Japanese premiere to its members, becoming a free-for-all a week later. The series was simulcast in French Speaking Europe by Dybex, starting January 14, 2010.

Aniplex released the first limited edition DVD, containing two episodes, on February 24, 2010, and as of March 24, 2010, two additional DVDs have been released. The seventh DVD, which was released on August 25, 2010, includes a direct-to-DVD episode.

The anime series is licensed in North America by Aniplex of America, while Beez Entertainment holds the license in UK and Germany. Dybex holds the rights in France and Benelux. Aniplex USA released Durarara!! in three digipak, two-disc sets. Part one was released on January 25, 2011, part two was released on March 29, 2011, and part three was released on May 31, 2011. They are sold at RightStuf.com and at Bandai Entertainment's The Store.

The anime was also broadcast in the United States on Cartoon Network's Adult Swim programming block from June 26 to December 18, 2011.

The anime uses four pieces of theme music. For the first twelve episodes,  by Theatre Brook is the opening theme, while "Trust Me" by Yuya Matsushita is the series' ending theme. "Trust Me" and "Uragiri no Yūyake" were released as singles on February 17, 2010, and February 24, 2010, respectively. From episode thirteen onwards, the opening theme became  by ROOKiEZ is PUNK'D, and the ending theme became "Butterfly" by On/Off.


Episode list

References

Durarara!!
2010 Japanese television seasons